Wagner Electric Corporation was an electric equipment manufacturing firm established in 1891 that became part of Studebaker-Worthington in 1967.

History

Wagner Electric Corporation was founded by Herbert Appleton Wagner and Ferdinand Schwedtmann (aka Francis Charles Schwedtman) in 1891. The company manufactured electric engines, electric motors and electric starters for early automobiles. They also made electric lights and many other electric-related products. In 1909, Wagner Electric started manufacturing their first automotive headlamp bulbs.

The International Association of Machinists held a strike at the Wagner Electric Company in St. Louis, Missouri from June 4 to October 7, 1918.

Before it became part of a conglomerate, Wagner had three main divisions.  It had the automotive division where it made brake parts and systems for autos and trucks.  It had the motor division which made small and large electric motors and it had the transformer division where it manufactured small and medium power transformers plus liquid-immersed distribution transformers.  The transformer division ended up as part of the Cooper Power Systems division.

In 1967 Wagner Electric was merged with Studebaker and Worthington Corporation to create Studebaker-Worthington, a diversified American manufacturer.
The combined company included profitable divisions from Studebaker such as Onan generators and STP engine additives, brake and electrical automobile component manufacturing from Wagner Electric, and diverse operations from Worthington that included manufacture of construction equipment, valves and power generation plant.

Wagner brands today
Today Wagner is part of the Federal-Mogul Motorparts group. Under the name Wagner Lighting Products, some of their brands include TruView, BriteLite, HalogenGold and LazerBlue. They also make brake pads under the name Wagner Brake Products.

References

American companies disestablished in 1967
American companies established in 1891
Manufacturing companies disestablished in 1967
Manufacturing companies established in 1891
Defunct automotive companies of the United States